Live...Madison Square Garden 1977 is a  live album by the American funk band Parliament-Funkadelic. The album was released on CD and vinyl in the UK in November 2017 by the RoxVox label. The CD incorrectly states that it features a live performance from the band at Madison Square Garden in 1977, when in actuality, the recording features the rehearsals for the Mothership Connection tour, done on September 26, 1976 at Stewart International Airport in Newburgh, New York. The liner notes feature a transcription of a December 1977 article about Parliament-Funkadelic from Circus (magazine) magazine.

Track listing

 Mothership Connection (Star Child)
 Dr. Funkenstein
 Do That Stuff
 Standing On The Verge Of Getting It On> Undisco Kidd
 Gettin' To Know You
 Coming Round The Mountain
 Maggot Brain> Good To Your Earhole

Personnel

Bass: Cordell Mosson
Guitars: Michael Hampton, Garry Shider, Glenn Goins
Drums: Jerome Brailey
Horns: Fred Wesley (trombone), Maceo Parker (saxophone), Richard Griffith (trumpet), and Rick Gardner (trumpet)
Keyboards: Bernie Worrell
Vocals: George Clinton, Glen Goins, Garry Shider, Fuzzy Haskins, Grady Thomas, Calvin Simon, Ray Davis, Debbie Wright, Jeanette Washington
 

George Clinton (funk musician) albums
2017 live albums